Raketa Stadium is a sports venue in Kazan. It is the home of Dynamo Kazan.

History 
 Stadium was built in 1947.
 In 2000 the stadium hosted the Russian Government Cup.
 Hosted the 2005 and 2011 Bandy World Championships.

References

Bandy venues in Russia
Sport in Kazan